Eta Cancri, Latinized from η Cancri, is a single, orange-hued star in the zodiac constellation of Cancer. It is a faint star but visible to the naked eye with an apparent visual magnitude of 5.34. The annual parallax shift of 10.93 mas as seen from Earth yields a distance estimate of 155 light years from the Sun. It is moving further away with a radial velocity of +22 km/s.

A stellar classification of K3 III for Eta Cancri indicates that, at the estimated age of 3.9 billion years old, it has left the main sequence and become an evolved giant star. The spectrum shows unusually strong absorption lines of cyanogen. It has 1.5 times the mass of the Sun and has expanded to 17 times the Sun's radius. The star is radiating 87 times the Sun's luminosity from its photosphere at an effective temperature of around 4,415 K.

In Chinese astronomy, Ghost refers to an asterism consisting of Theta Cancri, Eta Cancri, Gamma Cancri and Delta Cancri. Eta Cancri itself is the second star of Ghost, following the designation from its determinative star (θ Cnc) from east to west.

References

K-type giants
Cancer (constellation)
Cancri, Eta
Durchmusterung objects
Cancri, 33
072292
041909
3366